Mount Napier State Park is a state park in the Australian state of Victoria.  It is 20 km northeast of Mount Eccles; its centerpiece is Mount Napier, a true volcanic cone.  The park was established in 1987, and today encompasses 2800 hectares of land. The local Aboriginal name for the mount is Tapoc.

See also
 List of volcanoes in Australia

References

State parks of Victoria (Australia)
Protected areas established in 1987
Parks of Barwon South West (region)